The 2022 Champion Hurdle was a horse race held at Cheltenham Racecourse on Tuesday 15 March 2022. It was the 92nd running of the Champion Hurdle.

The race was won for the second year in a row by the 8/11 favourite Honeysuckle, ridden by Rachael Blackmore and trained by Henry de Bromhead.

Race details
 Sponsor: Unibet
 Purse: 
 Going:Good to soft
 Distance:2 miles 87 yards
 Number of runners: 10
 Winner's time: 3:50.13

References

External links
2022 Champion Hurdle at the Racing Post

Champion Hurdle
2022
Champion Hurdle
2020s in Gloucestershire
Champion Hurdle